Saint-Géry (which refers to Saint Gaugericus) may refer to:
 Saint-Géry, Dordogne, France
 Saint-Géry, Chastre, Belgium
 Saint-Géry, Lot, France
 Île Saint-Géry, a former island in Brussels, Belgium.